The grey-headed chachalaca (Ortalis cinereiceps) is a member of an ancient group of birds of the family Cracidae, which includes chachalacas, guans, and curassows. It is found from Honduras to Colombia.

Taxonomy and systematics

The family Cracidae is closely related to the guineafowl (Numididae), the pheasants, grouse and allies (Phasianidae), and the New World quail (Odontophoridae). The grey-headed chachalaca was at one time treated as conspecific with the chestnut-winged chachalaca (Ortalis garrula). It is monotypic; several subspecies have been proposed and not accepted.

Description

The grey-headed chachalaca is a medium-sized bird, similar in general appearance to turkeys, with a small head, long strong legs, and a long broad tail. They have fairly dull plumage, grayish brown above and paler below. The head is dark grey with a red dewlap and the blackish tail is tipped with buff. Their primary flight feathers are bright chestnut. Juveniles are browner overall, especially on the head.

Distribution and habitat

The grey-headed chachalaca is found from Mosquitia in eastern Honduras through eastern Nicaragua and most of Costa Rica and Panama into Colombia's Chocó Department. In addition to mainland Panama it occurs on Isla del Rey, where it might have been introduced by native Americans. It inhabits a variety of humid landscapes characterized by dense vegetation such as thickets, secondary forest, brushy abandoned fields, and thinned forests. It shuns the interior of dense forest though it can occur in their edges.

Behavior

Feeding

The grey-headed chachalaca forages typically in groups of six to 12 but sometimes up to 20, usually in the vegetation but sometimes on the ground. Its diet is about 75% fruit, 17% leaves, and 8% invertebrates. In the dry season it visits rivers to drink in the morning and evening.

Breeding

The grey-headed chachalaca's egg-laying season spans at least January to May, which overlaps the rainy season. The female lays three dull white eggs and incubates them alone.

Vocalization

The grey-headed chachalaca is less noisy than plain (O. vetula) or rufous-vented chachalacas (O. ruficauda). Its song is a soft "cha-cha-lac-ah". Flocks give raucous calls described as "kloik, kleeuk kraahk". It also makes a variety of screams, sharp alarm calls, and a quiet purr.

Status

The IUCN has assessed the grey-headed chachalaca as being of Least Concern. It varies from fairly common to common throughout its range though in some areas the population has been significantly reduced by hunting. It adapts well to some habitat disturbance.

References

Other reading

External links

 
 

grey-headed chachalaca
Birds of Nicaragua
Birds of Costa Rica
Birds of Panama
grey-headed chachalaca
grey-headed chachalaca